Tamara van Vliet (born 31 December 1994) is a Dutch swimmer. She competed in the women's 50 metre freestyle event at the 2017 World Aquatics Championships.

References

External links
 

1994 births
Living people
Dutch female freestyle swimmers
People from Oegstgeest
Sportspeople from South Holland
21st-century Dutch women